Nina Helen Nilsen (born 4 February 1970) is a Norwegian sport wrestler. Her achievements include a silver medal at the world championships and twice national champion.

Career
Nilsen became Norwegian champion in 1989 and 2000, and won silver medals in 1988, 1998, 1999 and 2001.

She won a silver medal at the 1989 World Wrestling Championships.

Personal life
Nilsen was born in Kristiansund on 4 February 1970.

References

1970 births
Living people
Norwegian female sport wrestlers
World Wrestling Championships medalists
20th-century Norwegian women